Laryssa Biesenthal, born 22 June 1971, in Walkerton, Ontario is a Canadian former representative rower rower. She is a dual Olympic medallist and represented Canada in sweep-oared and sculling boats at four World Rowing Championships, medalling on each occasion.

Rowing career
Biesenthal first started rowing as a student at the University of British Columbia in 1990.

She made her national representative debut for Canada at the 1995 World Rowing Championships in Tampere, Finland, where she won a silver medal in the quadruple sculls event with Kathleen Heddle, Marnie McBean and Diane O’Grady. This same quad won bronze at the 1996 Atlanta Olympics. Biensenthal went on to win a silver medal at the 1997 World Rowing Championships, silver and bronze medals at the 1998 World Rowing Championships, and another bronze at the 1999 World Championships. 

Biensenthal won two more medals before retiring, gold at the 1999 Pan American Games, and a final bronze at the 2000 Sydney Olympic Games.

Coaching career
After her retirement from competitive rowing, she worked as a coach for the Canadian national team prior to the 2004 Summer Games. She has been Head Coach at the Brentwood School in Vancouver and in 2022 took a senior coaching role at the Sydney University Boat Club.

Biesenthal has worked as a World Rowing Development Coach in Asia and Oceania was inducted into the University of British Columbia Hall of Fame in 2014.

References

External links
 
 
 
 

1971 births
Living people
Canadian female rowers
Olympic rowers of Canada
Olympic bronze medalists for Canada
Olympic medalists in rowing
Rowers at the 1996 Summer Olympics
Rowers at the 2000 Summer Olympics
Medalists at the 1996 Summer Olympics
Medalists at the 2000 Summer Olympics
Pan American Games medalists in rowing
Pan American Games gold medalists for Canada
Rowers at the 1999 Pan American Games
Medalists at the 1999 Pan American Games
World Rowing Championships medalists for Canada
Rowers from Ontario
People from Bruce County
20th-century Canadian women